The William A. Haseltine House is a house located in northeast Portland, Oregon listed on the National Register of Historic Places.

It was designed by architect Jamieson Parker.

See also
 National Register of Historic Places listings in Northeast Portland, Oregon

References

External links
 

1935 establishments in Oregon
Colonial Revival architecture in Oregon
Georgian Revival architecture in Oregon
Grant Park, Portland, Oregon
Houses completed in 1935
Houses on the National Register of Historic Places in Portland, Oregon
Portland Historic Landmarks